HMS Irwell has been the name of two Royal Navy vessels:

  was a  sloop of war launched as Sir Bevis in 1918. She was renamed Irwell in 1923 and Eaglet in 1926. She was scrapped in 1971.
  was a  minesweeper laid down as Bridlington she was renamed Goole before her launch in 1919. In 1926 she was completed and renamed Irwell. She was scrapped in 1962.

Royal Navy ship names